The Kentucky School for the Blind is an educational facility for blind and visually impaired students from Kentucky who are aged up to 21.

Bryce McLellan Patten founded the Kentucky Institution for the Education of the Blind in 1839 in Louisville, Kentucky.  In 1842, it was chartered as the Kentucky Institution for the Blind by the state legislature as the third state-supported school for the blind established in the United States.  In 1855, it moved to its present location on Frankfort Avenue in the Clifton neighborhood.  About this time, it was renamed the Kentucky School for the Blind. Today, it continues its mission of teaching the blind and visually impaired students. The institution has inspired people to build other organizations to benefit those who are visually impaired.

The school separated African-American students under de jure educational segregation in the United States until it desegregated circa 1954.

The school is a member of Council of Schools for the Blind (COSB).

The school has residential (dormitory) facilities.

Press 
An ex-principal of the school has accused the Kentucky Board of Education of gender discrimination.

The facility receives no basic school funding from the state government, and instead must "rely on money from the state’s general fund."

Grammy winning bluegrass fiddler Michael Cleveland is a previous student of the facility. Another previous student became a notable advocate for others with visual impairments.

A book has been published noting the experiences of the students and faculty of the institution.

References

External links
 Kentucky School for the Blind
 American Printing House for the Blind

Schools in Louisville, Kentucky
Schools for the blind in the United States
Educational institutions established in 1839
Neoclassical architecture in Kentucky
Public elementary schools in Kentucky
Public middle schools in Kentucky
Public high schools in Kentucky
Public K-12 schools in the United States
Public boarding schools in the United States
Boarding schools in Kentucky